Gabriel Sundukian (11 July 1825 – 29 March 1912) was an Armenian writer and playwright, the founder of modern Armenian drama.

Biography
Born in Tiflis, in a wealthy Armenian family, Sundukian learned both classical and modern Armenian, French, Italian and Russian, studied at the University of Saint-Petersburg, where he wrote a dissertation on the principles of Persian versification. Then he returned to Tiflis and entered the civil service. In 1854–58 he was banished to Derbend (Dagestan, Russia). In 1863, the Armenian theatre company of Tiflis staged his first play, Sneezing at Night's Good Luck. His well-known play "Pepo" (1871) was made into the first Armenian talkie in 1935. Another famous film based on his work is "Khatabala" (1971). The G. Sundukyan State Academic Theatre in Yerevan is named in his honor.

Plays

Quandary (Khatabala), 1866
Pepo, 1871
Ruined Family (Kanduats ochakhe), 1873
Love and Liberty (Ser yev azatutyun), 1910

References

Further reading
The Heritage of Armenian Literature: From the Eighteenth Century to Modern Times, By Agop J. Hacikyan, Gabriel Basmajian, Edward S. Franchuk, Wayne State University Press, 2005,

External links

 
Sundukian at IMDB

1825 births
1912 deaths
Writers from Tbilisi
Armenian male writers
20th-century Armenian dramatists and playwrights
Georgian people of Armenian descent
Dramatists and playwrights from Georgia (country)
Burials at Armenian Pantheon of Tbilisi
Male dramatists and playwrights
Nersisian School alumni
19th-century Armenian dramatists and playwrights
20th-century dramatists and playwrights from Georgia (country)
19th-century dramatists and playwrights from Georgia (country)
19th-century male writers
20th-century male writers